Seheno Razafindramaso (born 25 July 1986) is a retired Malagasy tennis player.

Razafindramaso has a WTA singles career high ranking of 964 achieved on 10 March 2008. She also has a WTA doubles career high ranking of 727 achieved on 10 March 2008.

Playing for Madagascar in Fed Cup, Razafindramaso has a W/L record of 1–0.

ITF finals (0–1)

Doubles (0–1)

ITF Junior Finals

Singles Finals (0–1)

Doubles (12–4)

National representation

Fed Cup
Razafindramaso made her Fed Cup debut for Madagascar in 2016, while the team was competing in the Europe/Africa Zone Group III, when she was 29 years and 264 days old.

Fed Cup (1–0)

Doubles (1–0)

References

External links 
 
 
 

1986 births
Living people
Malagasy female tennis players
African Games medalists in tennis
African Games bronze medalists for Madagascar
Competitors at the 2007 All-Africa Games